Lat Jor Ngoné Latir Diop (1842–1886), son of Sahewer Sohna Mbay (Sakhéwère Sokhna Mbaye) and the Linguère royal Ngoné Latir Fal (Ngoné Latyr Fall), Ngoné Latyr Fall was from the Wolof Dynasty of Paleen Dedd which ruled the two kingdoms of Cayor and Baol. Lat Joor was a nineteenth-century damel (king) of Cayor, a Wolof state that is today in south-central Sénégal. Lat Jor belonged to the Geej or Guedj Wolof maternal dynasty that had ruled Baol and Cayor for two centuries. The matriarch of that matriclan was the Wolof Lingeer Ngoné Dièye, a Princess from Tubé Dieye in Gandiol. Gandiol is a Wolof region in the north of Senegal that borders Mauritania. Lat Jor was a direct maternal descendant of Lingeer Ngoné Dièye of Tubé Dieye.

Religion
Lat Jior was born a Muslim in the Muslim family of Sakhewar Fatma. His grandfather Sakhewar Fatma Converted to Islam from the Wolof Islamic scholar of Coki Matar Ndoumé Diop . Lat Joor had a second conversion to Islam for political reasons to gain a political alliance with the Almamy of Rip, Maba Diakhou Bâ.

First Reign as Damel
Lat Jor was elected after a damel supported by the French was overthrown and was only 19 or 20 when he came to power. He was the first leader not to have patrilineal descent from the Faal family which founded Cayor, but legends insist his father's family descended from the founder of the Jolof Empire. He fought the French, waging a stealth campaign, but was ultimately forced to retreat and stay in the court of Maba Diakhou Bâ in the Saalum region bordering Gambia.

Conquests Alongside Maba

Lat Jor led his troops beside Maba in the battle of Rip on 30 November 1865, at the battle of Pathé Badiane in 1864 and Ngol Ngol in 1865. With Lat Jor, Maba took part in the conquests of the states of Baol and Djolof. They, however, couldn't conquer the Serer Kingdom of Sine and were defeated at The Battle of Fandane-Thiouthioune (18 July 1867) by Maad a Sinig Kumba Ndoffene Famak Joof (King of Sine).

Return to Cayor
At Kaolack in 1865, they combined forces with soldiers from Waalo, Ndiambour, and Ndiander to face the French fortifications of the governor Émile Pinet-Laprade but were repulsed.

After the French conquered Waalo, (re-appointed) governor Louis Faidherbe invaded Cayor in 1865 to stop the Damel's opposition to the construction of the Dakar to Saint-Louis railway. Dior is reported to have told the later French Governor Servatius:

"As long as I live, be assured, I shall oppose, with all my might the construction of this railway."

But the French defeated Lat Jor's forces at the Battle of Dekheule on 26 October 1868, after Faidherbe's retirement. 

In early 1869, after Maba's death, Lat Jor was allowed to return to Cayor. Lat Jor struck a deal for limited autonomy and re-installment in 1871. In response to further French expansion, Cayor rose again with Dior at their head, only to be defeated and be annexed again in 1879.

The Cayor kingdom was extinguished in its entirety on October 6, 1886.

The Legend of Lat Jor
Faidherbe is reputed to have said of Lat Jor's troops: "Ceux-là, on les tue on ne les déshonore pas." ("They can be killed but not dishonored"). This has been adapted as the motto of the Senegalese Army: "On nous tue, on ne nous déshonore pas".

In Dakar, there is a giant statue of Maalaw, the legendary horse of Lat Jor, near the great mosque.

Ancestry Chart of Lat Jor

See also
Cayor
Jolof Empire
History of Senegal
Maissa Bigué Ngoné Fall
Lingeer Ngoné Dièye
Maad a Sinig Ama Joof Gnilane Faye Joof
Maad a Sinig Mahecor Joof

Bibliography

Marie Casanova, Lat Dior : le dernier souverain du Cayor, ABC : Nouvelles éditions africaines, 1976
Amadou Cissé Dia, Les Derniers jours de Lat Dior suivi de La mort du Damel, Présence Africaine, 1965
Denys Ferrando-Durfort, Lat Dior : le résistant, Paris, Chiron, 1989, 45 p. 
Vincent Monteil, « Lat-Dior, damel du Kayor (1842-1886) et l'islamisation des Wolofs », in Esquisses sénégalaises (Wâlo, Kayor, Dyolof, Mourides, un visionnaire), Dakar, IFAN, 1966, 244 p.
Mamadou Seyni M'bengue, Le procès de Lat Dior, D.A.E.C., 1970

Fiction

Thierno Bâ, Lat-Dior – Le chemin de l'honneur, drame historique en huit tableaux, Dakar, Impr. Diop, 1970, 100 p.

References
 1. Curry, Ginette. In Search of Maba: A 19th Century Epic from Senegambia, West Africa. Phoenix Press International, Maryland, USA, 2011..

1842 births
1886 deaths
People of French West Africa
Senegalese royalty
History of Senegal